Hodophilus is a genus of agarics (gilled fungi) in the family Clavariaceae. Basidiocarps (fruit bodies) are dull-coloured and have dry caps, rather distant, decurrent lamellae, white spores, and smooth, ringless stems. In Europe species are characteristic of old, unimproved grasslands (termed waxcap grasslands) which are a declining habitat, making them of conservation concern. Several species have a distinct odour of napthalene.

Taxonomy

History
Hodophilus was described by French mycologist Roger Heim in 1957, but this was invalid because he did not include a Latin diagnosis for the genus, as was required by the rules of nomenclature at the time. The name Hodophilus was later (1958) validly published, but it was generally regarded as synonymous with the genus Camarophyllopsis.

Current Status
Recent molecular research, based on cladistic analysis of DNA sequences, indicates that Hodophilus is monophyletic and forms a natural group distinct from Camarophyllopsis.

Species

 Hodophilus albofloccipes (Kovalenko, E.F.Malysheva & O.V.Morozova) Looney & Adamčík 2016 – Russia
 Hodophilus atropunctus (Pers.) Birkebak & Adamčík 2016 - Europe
 Hodophilus cambriensis Adamčík & D.J. Harries 2018 - Europe
 Hodophilus carpathicus Jančovič. & Adamčík 2019 - Europe
 Hodophilus decurrentior Adamčík, Jančovič., Læssøe & Dima 2019 - Europe
 Hodophilus foetens (W.Phillips) Birkebak & Adamčík 2017 – Europe
 Hodophilus fuscofoetens S. Arauzo, P. Iglesias & J. Fernández Vicente 2018 - Europe
 Hodophilus glabripes Ming Zhang, C.Q. Wang & T.H. Li 2019 - China
 Hodophilus hesleri Adamčík, Birkebak & Looney 2016 - North America
 Hodophilus hymenocephalus (A.H.Sm. & Hesler) Birkebak & Adamčík 2016 - North America
 Hodophilus indicus K.N.A. Raj, K.P.D. Latha & Manim. 2017 - India
 Hodophilus micaceus (Berk. & Broome) Birkebak & Adamčík 2016 - Europe
 Hodophilus pallidus Adamčík, Jančovič. & Looney 2016 - Europe
 Hodophilus paupertinus (A.H.Sm. & Hesler) Adamčík, Birkebak & Looney 2016 - North America
 Hodophilus peckianus (Howe) Adamčík, Birkebak & Looney 2016 - North America
 Hodophilus phaeophyllus (Romagn.) Arauzo & Iglesias 2018 – Europe
 Hodophilus phaeoxanthus (Romagn.) Adamčík & Jančovič. 2018 – Europe
 Hodophilus praecox S. Arauzo 2018 - Europe
 Hodophilus rugulosus (A.H.Sm. & Hesler) Adamčík & Jančovič. 2018 - North America
 Hodophilus smithii Adamčík, Birkebak & Looney 2016 - North America
 Hodophilus stramineus Jančovič., Dima & Adamčík 2019 - Europe
 Hodophilus subfoetens Adamčík, Jančovič. & Looney 2016 - Europe
 Hodophilus subfuscescens (A.H.Sm. & Hesler) Adamčík, Birkebak & Looney 2016 = North America
 Hodophilus tenuicystidiatus Jančovič., Adamčík & Looney 2016 - Europe
 Hodophilus variabilipes Jančovičová, Adamčík & Looney 2017 - Europe

See also
List of Agaricales genera

References

Clavariaceae
Agaricales genera
Taxa described in 1958